Fare evasion or fare dodging, fare violation, rarely called ticket evasion, is the act of travelling on public transport without paying by deliberately not buying a required ticket to travel (having had the chance to do so). It is considered a problem in many parts of the world, and revenue protection officers and ticket barriers, staffed or automatic, are in place to ensure only those with valid tickets may access the transport. The term fare avoidance is sometimes used as a euphemistic synonym and sometimes used to refer to the lawful use of much cheaper tickets.

Fare evasion and fare fraud may or may not be a crime depending on which jurisdictions. The fare not paid, compared to potential penalties and hassle, is generally considered "not worth it".

Methods

On stations 

One method of fare evasion is jumping or climbing over the turnstiles which bar the entryway into a subway system; hence the term, "turnstile jumping". Fare-dodgers also can walk right behind a passenger with a valid ticket before closing of some types of ticket barrier gates (this is  called tailgating). Other methods include adults traveling on children's tickets, or using discounted tickets or free passes that the passenger is not entitled to. They also can purchase valid tickets for shorter journeys in order to get through the entry and exit barriers at a much lower price than their actual journey, or even board a vehicle with just a platform ticket, such practice is called "doughnutting" since the ticket coverage looks like a doughnut on the Tube map.

However, ticket barriers are often watched by ticket inspectors and guards, and in that case fare-dodgers may climb over fences of a station or simply walk alongside railway tracks or use passes for railway staff to enter or exit the station without passing through ticket barriers. In some cases fare-dodgers can break and destroy fences around a train station to make a passage.

On vehicles 

On vehicles fare-dodgers usually try to avoid ticket inspectors or conductors. On commuter trains with a sufficient number of passenger coaches one of the most common methods is walking away from ticket inspectors to other coaches and running on the platform in the opposite direction to the coaches that ticket inspectors already passed. On short commuter trains or especially intercity and long-distance passenger trains fare-dodgers can hide from ticket inspectors in toilets, luggage compartments, staff rooms and other utility chambers inside the train.

Another issue occurs on the bus or tram; passengers either bypass the bus driver or enter through the rear door of the vehicle. If a bus or tram has a turnstile installed in it, fare-dodgers can jump over or crawl under the turnstile. In most countries passengers board a bus from any door, validate their tickets at machines and have no contact with the driver, thus increasing the potential for fare evasion.

Passengers can also arrange for ticket inspectors to allow them to travel by offering bribes.

A dangerous method of fare evasion is the riding on exterior parts of a vehicle (on a rooftops, rear parts, between cars, skitching, or underneath a vehicle), also known as a "vehicle surfing" (train surfing, car surfing). Another method is hiding inside the utility cells under a railway car. Fare dodgers can practice this type of travelling unless it is very hard or impossible to hide from ticket inspectors inside a vehicle.

Countermeasures

Technical devices

Ticket barriers 

Turnstiles are used to obstruct invalid access. Since most fare-dodgers know how to pass a gate without paying, turnstiles may be replaced with ticket barriers in a less easily transversed form, or may be integrated more closely with an electronic ticket system. Ticket barriers can also require the travellers to show their tickets upon exiting. Typically turnstiles are used at train stations, however some city transit systems install turnstiles inside city street vehicles, for example buses and trams.

Panic bars 
Panic bars on emergency exit doors are in all stations of the New York City Subway. Panic bar alarms have been silenced since 2014 due to regularity of non-emergency passenger use.

Panic bars were also installed on Massachusetts Bay Transportation Authority (MBTA) in Boston and on Chicago Transit Authority (CTA). This provided an impetus for renewed interests in evasion, because
evaders could enter through gates when already opened by exiting passengers.

Closed circuit television (CCTV)
Closed-circuit television (CCTV) monitoring is used by many public transport companies to combat vandalism and other public order crimes. Using CCTV to apprehend fare-dodgers in the act requires full-time human monitoring of the cameras. 
Sophisticated CCTV systems discriminate the scenes to detect and segregate suspicious behaviour from numerous screens and to enable automatic alerting. However, the attentiveness of the surveillance personnel may be threatened by false reliance on automatics.

Fare control staff

Ticket inspectors 

With manual fare collection, fare evasion can become more difficult and stigmatizing for the fare-dodging traveller, especially usage of discounted tickets (for example child, student or pensioner tickets) by passengers who are not allowed to use it. Ticket inspectors can verify tickets of passengers during the trip or during a boarding on vehicle (the last form of fare control is a common practice on long-distance rail transport). In some cases ticket inspectors are assigned to a certain vehicle during its trip on entire route (usually on long-distance or some commuter transport) and often, in another case they randomly check multiple vehicles (usually city public transport and some commuter transport). Transit systems which use honor systems under normal circumstances may employ staff to collect fares at times and places where heavy use can be expected—for example, at stations serving a stadium after the conclusion of a major sporting event.

Ticket inspectors can also watch for turnstiles at train stations to avoid unauthorized passing without a valid ticket and using discounted tickets. Ticket inspectors may or may not be allowed to use force to prevent or apprehend fare-dodgers.

Uniformed guards 
The presence of uniformed guards can act as a deterrent to fare evasion, especially unauthorized passing through turnstiles. Guards may or may not be allowed to use force to prevent or apprehend fare-dodgers.

Police officers 
Police officers can watch turnstiles and escort ticket inspectors in vehicles, and unlike ticket inspectors and guards they are allowed to use force to prevent or apprehend fare-dodgers. It is sometimes common for police officers dressed in plain clothes to patrol subway stations. As such, they have all the jurisdiction that normal officers have when policing the transit system. For example, Sydney Trains use a combination of ticket inspectors and police patrols to enforce compliance with fare requirements. These police are part of the NSW Police Force transport command and are equipped with Opal card readers to inspect them.

Penalization

Penalty fare 

A penalty fare is a special fare charged at a higher than normal price because the purchaser did not comply with the normal ticket purchasing rules. Typically penalty fares are incurred by passengers failing to purchase a ticket before travelling or by purchasing an incorrect ticket which does not cover their whole journey.

Penalty fares are not fines, and are used when no legal basis for prosecuting fare evasion exists, prosecution is deemed too drastic and costly, or is unlikely to result in conviction.

Civil and criminal penalties 

On some systems, fare evasion is considered a misdemeanor. In such cases, police officers and in some cases transit employees are authorized to issue tickets which usually carry a fine. Then, charged persons can be tried in court. Repeat violators and severe cases, such as ticket forgery, are punished more severely and sometimes involve incarceration. Wealthy offenders sometimes face stiffer penalties than poorer offenders.

Evasion fines vary. On Metropolitan Atlanta Rapid Transit Authority (MARTA), evasion fines range from $85 to $235, whereas they "start at $50" on the San Francisco Municipal Railway. In Boston, prior to CharlieCard AFC implementation and conversion of booth clerks to roving agents, MBTA quietly asked Massachusetts State Legislature to make evasions a civil offense punishable by progressive fines ($15 first offense; $100 second; $250 third or subsequent). On the Newark Light Rail, which uses a proof-of-payment system, the fine was initially $75, but increased to $100 in 2008.

In the US, the MBTA, CTA, and Port Authority Trans-Hudson (PATH) also use sophisticated camera equipment.  The MBTA even apprehended vandals damaging AFC equipment while evading, and published the video footage.

In December, 2018, the Council of the District of Columbia voted to decriminalize fare evasion. Prior to decriminalization, over 90% of citations and summons for fare evasion were issued to African Americans. Fare evasion in Washington, D.C. is now a civil offense with a $50 fine, rather than a criminal offense with up to 10 days in jail and a $300 fine.

See also
Farebox recovery ratio
Fare strike
Stowaway
Public transport security
British Transport Police
New York City Transit fare evasion
Planka.nu

References

Public transport fare collection
Administrative law
Criminal law